opened in Itoman, Okinawa Prefecture, Japan in 1989. Located within Okinawa Senseki Quasi-National Park, it is dedicated to the Himeyuri Student Corps during the Battle of Okinawa and to the ideal of Peace.

See also

 Okinawa Prefectural Peace Memorial Museum
 Cornerstone of Peace

References

External links
  Himeyuri Peace Museum
  Himeyuri Peace Museum

Itoman, Okinawa
Museums in Okinawa Prefecture
Peace museums
Battle of Okinawa
Museums established in 1989
1989 establishments in Japan
World War II museums in Japan